Gerald Thomas Zerkin (born March 1, 1949) is an American lawyer. He is a senior assistant federal public defender in Richmond, Virginia.

Career
Zerkin attended Brandeis University, where he received his bachelor's degree in 1971, University of Virginia where he received his master's degree in 1973, and Boston College, where he received his degree in Law in 1976.
He began private practice in 1978, and began his work defending death row inmates in 1980, including Earl Washington. He has specialized in death penalty defense and civil rights. At their annual dinner in 1999, Virginians for Alternatives to the Death Penalty (VADP) awarded and praised him as an expert capital case litigator. In 2001, he joined the public defender's office.

Zerkin led the unsuccessful defense, with Edward B. McMahon Jr., at the trial of Al Qaeda member Zacarias Moussaoui.

Zerkin heads Zerkin & Associates.

References

1949 births
Brandeis University alumni
Living people
Boston College Law School alumni
University of Virginia alumni
American anti–death penalty activists
Virginia lawyers
20th-century American lawyers
21st-century American lawyers
Public defenders